Fall River Railroad may refer to:

 Fall River Branch Railroad; The original rail link from Fall River, Massachusetts to Myricks Junction, which merged into the:
 Fall River Railroad (1846); A railroad company established in 1846, connecting Fall River, Massachusetts to South Braintree, Massachusetts
 Fall River Railroad (1874); A railroad company established in 1874, connecting Fall River, Massachusetts to New Bedford
Both railroads would later become part of the Old Colony Railroad system.